Aquarius may refer to:

Astrology  

 Aquarius (astrology), an astrological sign 
 Age of Aquarius, a time period in the cycle of astrological ages

Astronomy 
 Aquarius (constellation)
 Aquarius in Chinese astronomy

Arts and entertainment

Film and television
 Aquarius (film), a 2016 Brazilian–French drama film
 Aquarius (British TV series), a British arts television series
 Aquarius (American TV series), an American period crime drama television series

Music 
 Aquarius (opera), by Karel Goeyvaerts
 Aquarius (Aqua album), 2000
 Aquarius (Haken album), 2010
 Aquarius (Nicole Mitchell album), 2013
 Aquarius (Tinashe album), 2014
 Aquarius (EP), by Boards of Canada, 1998
 "Aquarius" (song), a song from the 1967 musical Hair
 "Aquarius/Let the Sunshine In", a 5th Dimension medley of two songs, 1969
 "Aquarius", a song by Within Temptation from the 2004 album The Silent Force

Other uses in arts and entertainment
 Aquarius (game), a card game published by Looney Labs
 Aquarius (Marvel Comics), various Marvel Comics characters
 Aquarius (DC Comics), a DC Comics character
 Aquarius Festival, Australian alternative festival in early 1970s

Places
 Aquarius Casino Resort, Laughlin, Nevada, U.S.
 Aquarius Mountains, Arizona, U.S.

Science and technology 
 Aquarius (bug), a genus of aquatic bug
 Aquarius Reef Base, an underwater laboratory located in the Florida Keys National Marine Sanctuary
 Aquarius (SAC-D instrument), on board the SAC-D spacecraft
 Aquarius (rocket), a low-cost launch vehicle concept
 Aquarius, the lunar module of Apollo 13
 Mattel Aquarius, an early brand of home computers

Watercraft
 Aquarius 21, an American sailboat design
 Aquarius 23, an American sailboat design
 Aquarius Dignitus, formerly Aquarius 2 and Aquarius, a 1977-built dual-flagged search and rescue vessel
 Aquarius (yacht), a 92 m (302 ft) luxury yacht (superyacht)
  (MS Aquarius in 2001), a cruiseferry owned by DFDS Seaways
 SuperStar Aquarius, a cruise ship owned and operated by Star Cruises
 , an Andromeda-class attack cargo ship in the service of the United States Navy
 :pl:ORP Wodnik, a training ship in the Polish navy

Other uses 
 Aquarius (sports drink)
 Aquarius, penname of Lewis H. Morgan (1818–1881), American anthropologist and social theorist

See also
 Age of Aquarius (disambiguation)
 Aquarium (disambiguation)
 Aquarian (disambiguation)
 Aquarii, name given to the Christians who substituted water for wine in the Eucharist
 Water carrier